Jacob de Jager (16 January 1923 – 25 February 2004) was a general authority of the Church of Jesus Christ of Latter-day Saints (LDS Church). He was the first Dutch person to serve as a general authority. De Jager was born in the Netherlands and joined the church while living in Toronto, Ontario, Canada. His work took him to Australia, Indonesia, Mexico and Canada. His first calling in the church was hymnal coordinator which he filled honorably. He also served as elders quorum president, branch president, counselor to mission president and regional representative before his call to the First Quorum of the Seventy. In 1993, de Jager was designated an emeritus general authority and he later served as bishop of a ward in central Salt Lake City. He is one of few people to serve as a ward bishop after serving as a general authority. He died in 2004 of causes incident to age.

He married Bea Lim and they had two children. They were married in Indonesia and later, after joining the LDS Church, were sealed in the Bern Switzerland Temple.  She died in March 2017.

References

"Elder Jacob de Jager of the First Quorum of the Seventy", Ensign, May 1976

External links
Grampa Bill's G.A. Pages: Jacob de Jager

1923 births
2004 deaths
Dutch general authorities (LDS Church)
Dutch Mormon missionaries
Members of the First Quorum of the Seventy (LDS Church)
Mission presidents (LDS Church)
Regional representatives of the Twelve
Clergy from The Hague
Dutch expatriates in the United States
Dutch expatriates in Canada
Dutch expatriates in Australia
Dutch expatriates in Indonesia
Dutch expatriates in Mexico